Deli Yürek: Bumerang Cehennemi ("Crazy Heart: Boomerang Hell") is a 2001 Turkish action film, written and directed by Osman Sınav. It is spun off from the TV series Deli Yürek.

Plot
Yusuf Miroğlu goes with Zeynep to Diyarbakır in southeast Turkey to attend his best friend Cemal's wedding. While performing the traditional halay dance at the wedding, Cemal is killed by an assassin. Cemal's widowed wife Leyla pleads Yusuf to find the people behind the murder and bring them to justice. Yusuf finds himself caught in a struggle against the PKK and other terrorist groups in the area.

Cast
Kenan İmirzalıoğlu (Yusuf Miroğlu)
Melda Bekcan (Zeynep)
Oktay Kaynarca (Cemal)
Selçuk Yöntem (Bozo)
Zara (Leyla)

References

External links

2001 films
2000s Turkish-language films
2000s action drama films
Films set in Turkey
Turkish action films
Films directed by Osman Sınav
Turkish films about revenge
2001 drama films